Northbridge Services Group Ltd is a private military company (PMC) which is registered in the Dominican Republic.  It also has offices in the United Kingdom and Ukraine. The firm also has an address in Lexington in Kentucky, United States. Its president and CEO is US Army (retired) Lieutenant-Colonel Robert W. Kovacic. Many Northbridge personnel come from a military, political, governmental or diplomatic background.

History
In April 2003, the company was criticized by Baroness Symons of Vernham Dean for operations in Côte d'Ivoire that "seriously undermine the peace process".  In May 2003, Northbridge commandos rescued dozens of oil workers being held hostage on an oil rig.  In June 2003, the company offered to kidnap embattled Liberian president Charles Taylor for $4 million.  The offer was rejected and Northbridge was subsequently investigated by the FBI.

The firm hit the news in late 2003 when it announced it was seeking an investor to fund an operation to seize the disgraced ex-Liberian President Charles Taylor, who had been granted asylum in Nigeria at the time. Northbridge claimed that it had personnel that were ready to kidnap Taylor for a $2 million reward which had been offered by the United States Congress. A director at the firm, Pasquale Dipofi, said that any potential investors in the operation would be able to split the profits with the firm.

Services
Northbridge Services Group routinely provides governments, multi-national corporations, non-governmental organisations, the corporate sector and prominent individuals with:
Advice
Training
Operational support
Intelligence support
Political Analysis
Diplomatic Analysis
Humanitarian operations
Strategic communications
Support for law and order

See also
Aegis Defence Services
Executive Outcomes
Sandline International

References

External links
 

Private military contractors